Mauricio André Isais (born April 9, 2001) is an American professional soccer player who plays as a left-back for Liga MX club Pachuca.

Career statistics

Club

Honors
Pachuca
Liga MX: Apertura 2022

References

External links
 
 
 

2001 births
Living people
American soccer players
American sportspeople of Mexican descent
Association football defenders
Liga MX players
C.F. Pachuca players
Club León footballers
Soccer players from Texas